San Carlos, officially the City of San Carlos, is a 2nd class component city in the province of Negros Occidental, Philippines. According to the 2020 census, it has a population of 132,650 people.

The municipality's status was elevated into a city on July 1, 1960, per Republic Act No. 2643, approved on June 18, 1960, and Presidential Proclamation No. 685 s. 1960.

History

Pre-Spanish and Spanish colonization
San Carlos City was formerly named "Nabingkalan", deriving its name from Nabingka, a beautiful daughter of a chieftain of the Negrito settlement in the area, who ruled the barrio during the early part in the 17th century. She was famous for her loveliness and mental and physical prowess. After her death, the people mourned for two years, and to perpetuate her memory, named the barrio Nabingkalan. The settlement was later bought by Carlos Apurado from Badian, Cebu, who, with the help of fellow pioneers, developed the settlement into a thriving Christian village. Fragments of written history show that in 1856, the Island of Buglas (Negros), as a politico-military province under Spain, was divided into two provinces, West Negros under Iloilo and East Negros under Cebu. The barrio of Nabingkalan under Calatrava was under the jurisdiction of Iloilo. Señor Don Emilio Saravia, the first political-military governor in the island during the Spanish era, renamed the place and established it as a pueblo.

When this mission was created in 1895, it belonged to the municipality of Calatraba, although it is true, that since 1891 a Religious was destined for it. The state of those years gives us the very small number of inhabitants that comprised it, which is that of 1,100 souls, who rather inhabited the mountainous part than that of the plaza, where the current village is. Fr. Pedro Chivite was assigned to the service of that mission. Vacant this mission during the Revolution, for the year 1904 Father Eusebio Valderrama took care of it. This with the help of the PP. Ángel Quintana, Juan Lorenzo and Vicente Vázquez attended to all the towns of that coast, from Guinjulngan to Escalante. Since that date, it is still administered by our Fathers. But in what was a bad, poor and depopulated village in 97, today it is one of the most important towns in the rich Province of Negros Occidental. of San Carlos today amounts, according to approximate calculation, to 30,000 souls. That extensive plot of land previously uncultivated today is painstakingly worked. A Spaniard who observed the fertility of that land began by raising a small sugarcane farm; and seeing the good results obtained, others were added, those fields were cultivated, modern machines were installed and, thus, what was once a wasteland, today is one of the most productive villages in Negros. In 1889 there were only four estates, in 1897 they amounted to 16 and today they are some more, property in their majority of Spanish art.

Then in 1856 Negros was raised to the category of a politico-military province, Don Emilio Saravia being the first politico-military governor. It was during the governorship of Saravia that several towns of Occidental Negros, like San Isido, San Carlos, and Calatrava were established.

San Carlos prospered through the years, however, the village lost its pueblo category, and in 1890, when Negros Island was divided into Negros Occidental and Negros Oriental, San Carlos was recorded as an arrabal or barrio of Calatrava (Hilub-ang).

American colonization

During the first years of the American occupation of the Philippines, the economic and social pace of the activities of the people were gauged on the movements of the big landholders and Spaniards in the lowlands. In 1903, the political arena was a hot place, it being the first taste of the Filipinos to elect their own leaders. In 1912, when a sugar central was constructed, the economic life of the people was greatly enhanced. The political activities, however, was closely woven with that of Calatrava, until 1925, when Calatrava was organized into a municipality.

San Carlos Milling Company of San Carlos, Negros, have erected the first and only modern sugar mills in the Philippines, and they have gone into cane cultivation and sugar manufacture in a scientific way. The capacity of the mill is 1000 tons of cane per day, which means about 125 tons of centrifugal sugar. It was completed at the end of 1913 at a cost of about one million dollars, and the first cane ground was from the 1914 crop.

In 1920, Municipality of San Carlos comprised barrios Antabayan, Cubay, Euzcasa, Looc, Malalamban, San Juan, Santa Filomena, Sitio Banatic, Tigbon, Varconia.

The municipality of San Carlos shall consist of its present territory and that of the municipality of Calatrava, with the seat of the municipal government at the present municipality of San Carlos (Act No. 716, Enacted, April 2, 1903

The First World War encouraged the people of San Carlos to produce more sugar-producing crops. After the armistice in 1917, the planters who produced more sugar had their wealth greatly increased because of the new price of sugar never before enjoyed by the planters. During World War I, many sons of San Carlos volunteered to fight for the United States, but a few months later, were sent back home because of the armistice.

World War II
San Carlos was actively involved on the war efforts against Imperial Japan during The Second World War (World War II).  A month after the surrender of Negros to the Japanese Imperial Forces, the Guerrilla Movement began in San Carlos and Calatrava. As early as June 15, 1942, Guerilla Units under the leadership of Capt. Eugenio Antonio, Jr., Lt. Leonardo Marane and Lt. Alfredo Valdivia assisted by the Philippine Commonwealth Military Troops began operations against the enemy. Pitched battles were fought within the environs of the "poblacion". Despite the presence of the U.S. forces under Maj. Edward McClenahan, separate Guerrilla Units were scattered in the area under different Commanders as they were not able to establish a formal chain-of-command among the different Guerilla Factions effectively.

Upon the return of some local USAFFE officers to San Carlos, the guerrilla movement was formally organized into fighting units under USAFFE Capts. Catalino D. Rivera, Eugenio Antonio, Jr. and Loreto Y. Apuhin Sr., together with Lts. Florencio C. Yap and Andres L. Arrogante, the bands of roving guerrillas in San Carlos were consolidated under one command. Young men in their early teens (just barely enough to carry rifles) joined the ranks and fought bravely face-to-face against the Japanese.

In March 1945, the Philippine Commonwealth forces under the 7th, 71st and 72nd Infantry Division of the Philippine Commonwealth Army, 7th Infantry Regiment of the Philippine Constabulary and local guerrilla units under the command of Col. Ernesto S. Mata, attacked the Japanese garrison in the compound of San Carlos Milling Company and succeeded in driving away the Japanese Army, at the cost of the life of Lt. Alfredo Valdivia.

On October 10, 1945, President Sergio Osmeña appointed Eugenio Antonio as Acting Mayor of San Carlos and Anacleto Facturan as Acting Vice Mayor.

Former Pres. Manuel A. Roxas named Constancio Rabacal, appointed Mayor and Fausto Caballero, Vice Mayor of San Carlos, Negros Occidental, June 13, 1946.

Dionisio Gajo, appointed Councilor of San Carlos, Negros Occidental, September 9, 1946.

Juan Broce, appointed Vice Mayor of San Carlos, Negros Occidental, June 7, 1947.

Eufronio Dolino, Juan Broce, Victorino G. Apuhin, Carlos Jones, Alfredo Rivera, Feliciano Gauzon Fermin de la Victoria and Hipolito Rigor, appointed Councilors of San Carlos, Negros Occidental June 10, 1946.

Post-war period
The first post-war election found the town with a Liberal government. In 1953, the Nacionalista wrested the power from the Liberals.

Cityhood

By Virtue of Republic Act No. 2643, the Municipality of San Carlos was converted into the City of San Carlos on July 1, 1960. The city inherited from the municipality numerous improvements, introduced by the last municipal administration under Mayor Sofronio Carmona.

Geography

Located along the northeastern coast touching the Tañon Strait, San Carlos City is located at the crossroads of Bacolod and Dumaguete, the two major cities of the Negros Island Region. The city is also used as a departure point to Cebu City as well. It has a  coastline, of which some parts are covered with mangroves. The city has a deep natural harbor protected from inclement weather by the island of Refugio, also known as Sipaway.

Climate

San Carlos has two pronounced seasons, wet and dry. The rainy season is from May to January with heavy rains occurring during the months of August and September. Dry season lasts from February to April. December and January are the coldest months while April is the hottest.

Barangays

San Carlos is politically subdivided into 18 barangays.

Demographics

Cebuano is the major language of San Carlos City, closely followed by Hiligaynon. Both languages are understood and used in both, the urban and rural areas. English and to some extent Tagalog, are also spoken and understood, especially in the urban areas.

Economy 

Located in the city is San Carlos Solar Energy, owner of the SaCaSol I solar installation located in the north of the city, currently the largest operational solar plant in the Philippines.

Government

Elected officials
Members of the San Carlos City Council (2019-2022:
Mayor: Renato Y. Gustilo
Vice Mayor: Christopher Paul S. Carmona
Councilors
Carlos Manuel L. Valmayor
Benito Y. Gustilo Jr. 
Jose Carlos L. Villarante
Wilmer L. Yap
Philip Gerard B. Maisog
Clint S. Mansueto
Mark E. Cui
Alexander Y. Ongtiaobok
Jeffrey M. Hidalgo
Lorna Yap Hinolan
LIGA President: PB Ronaldo Batosin
SK Federation Representative: JB Spring C. Bacurnay

List of former chief executives
From 1899 to the last days of the administration of the municipality of San Carlos, the following persons have served as presidentes and mayors:

1899-1941
Agustin Ylagan (4 terms)
Bernardino Lazanas
Domingo Medina (2 terms)
Eugenio Antonio, Jr.
Fausto Caballero
Jose Cervantes
Juan P. Broce (2 terms)
Pelagio Carbajosa
Vicente Atienza
Vicente Flores

1942-1945
Antonio Azcona (in the occupied area)
Anacleto Factoran (in the free area)
Juan P. Broce

After 1945
Constancio Rabacal (2 terms)
Constancio Rabacal (Appointed, 1946)
Dominador Zaragoza (Appointed)
Eugenio Antonio, Jr. (Appointed)
Gregorio R. Reonisto (OIC, 1987)
Sofronio C. Carmona
Jose V. Valmayor Jr. 
Tranquilino B. Carmona 
Rogelio "Roger" Debulgado (3 terms, 1992–2001)
Eugenio Jose "Bong" Lacson
Gerardo "Ginggo" Valmayor Jr.

Tourism

The Pintaflores Festival was born out of the city's search for a cultural identity and tradition. In 1992 after successfully holding two activities with the Nabingkalan Tattoo Festival and the Dances of Flowers as highlights of the city fiesta, the idea of blending the two concepts to come up with a presentation that could be considered the city's very own started what today is one of the most popular street dancing festivals in the region, the present-day "Pintaflores Festival".

Pintaflores is coined from the words pintados ("painted ones"), the concept behind the Nabingkalan Tattoo Festival, and flores, the Spanish word for "flowers" that dominated the theme of the Dances of Flowers. The Pintaflores street dancing and ritual competition highlights the annual Pintaflores Festival every November 3–5.

It features rhythmic dances and dance dramas of life and death and the triumph of good against evil that depict the people's thanksgiving and merriment, abundant blessings and success. As part of the Pintados tradition, the faces, arms, bodies and legs of the dancers are painted with flowers to express gratitude to man and his environment.

The street dancing is culminated by a dance ritual performed at the City auditorium. Different dance steps and musical accompaniment add to the thrill of the competition. The human flower formation is another impressive part of the dance ritual which are products of the ingenuity and skill of the choreographers and dancers.

Colegio de Santo Tomas - Recoletos high school students, bested seasoned contestants to land third place in the free interpretation category in the heavily competed Sinulog festival in Cebu City in January 1993. In April of the same year, the group won the championship in Panaad Sa Negros '93, to province-wide cultural festival in Negros Occidental.

Represented by Barangays II and Quezon, the Pintaflores street dancing contingent emerged first prize in Panaad Sa Negros in 1996. The same group with the participation of Barangay Ermita secured again the championship in Panaad Sa Negros 1997 and the fifth prize in Sinulog festival '98.

In Panaad sa Negros '98, the Pintaflores group composed of dancers from Barangays Punao and Palampas and the City Hospital graced the fiesta presentation as guest performers. In Panaad '99 the Pintaflores represented this time by elementary school children, once again proved its unbeatable streak by emerging champions, consequently reaping the Hall of Fame award for topping the fiesta presentation event in four consecutive years.

Having established a name in street dancing, Pintaflores danced performers in such places as Iloilo City (1996) and Roxas City (1997) as among the best of the best in the region, and in Canlaon and Victorias in 1999 as the best in the province.

Pintaflores has evolved as a new breed of dancers emerged with the launching of Pintaflores Bata or Pinta Bata in 1996. A street dancing and ritual competition among elementary school children. Pinta Bata thrills one with the children's pleasing gracefulness and versatility that promises a crop of excellent dancers in the years to come.

After five years and many awards, including the Hall of Fame awards in street dancing in the Panaad sa Negros, the word Pintaflores, like "Daan Sa Kaunlaran" and Homelot program, now has become another byword of the creativity of San Carloseños.

Transportation

Pedicabs and Motorized tricycles are common mode of transport within the city. Buses and jeepneys provide service for inter-town travel. Local outriggers and pumpboats provide inter-island travel to and from Sipaway Island.

The city is also served by roll-on/roll-off ferry services to Toledo City, Cebu.

The city is one of the termini of the Negros Occidental Eco-Tourism Highway, numbered as N69 in the Philippine highway system. At the other end is the city of Bacolod, about 2 hours away.

Education

Julio Ledesma National High School
Colegio de Santa Rita de San Carlos, Inc.
Colegio de Santo Tomas – Recoletos
Central Negros College
Tañon College
Daisy's ABC School Foundation Inc.
Central Philippines State University - Justo V. Valmayor Campus
 Sipaway National High School
Don Carlos Ledesma National High School
Ramon Magsaysay Elementary School

Notable personalities

Another historical milestone in the life of the city is the cabinet meeting of President Fidel V. Ramos in the city on August 27, 1996, making San Carlos the first component city to be made the venue of a Presidential Cabinet meeting. Award-winning actress Assunta de Rossi became a resident in the city when she married then congressman Jules Ledesma. Former boxer Gerry Peñalosa also hails from the city. Romeo Villalva Tabuena, an artist included in the "Who's Who" in American arts, and has had works featured in publications like the “American Artists”, “Diplomat”, “Literary Review” and the “Reporter”, has family roots from San Carlos. Elizabeth Ramsey, a comedian and the mother of singer Jaya, and Dr. Gerry H. Tan, Chairman on the Division of Endocrinology at Cebu Doctors University College of Medicine - Cebu Doctors University Hospital from 1999 to present, also hail from the city. Reiven Bulado, an actor who played Ibo on an MMFF film Panaghoy sa Suba was born in San Carlos and studied highschool at Colegio de Santo Tomas – Recoletos.

References

External links

 [ Philippine Standard Geographic Code]
 

 
Cities in Negros Occidental
Populated places established in 1898
1898 establishments in the Philippines
Port cities and towns in the Philippines
Component cities in the Philippines